Lucien Hinge is a Vanuatuan footballer who plays as a defender.

References 

Living people
1992 births
Vanuatuan footballers
Vanuatu international footballers
Tafea F.C. players
2012 OFC Nations Cup players
Association football defenders
Vanuatu youth international footballers